Chesnokovo is a rural locality (a selo) and the administrative center of Chesnokovsky Selsoviet of Mikhaylovsky District, Amur Oblast, Russia. The population was 710 as of 2018. There are 18 streets.

Geography 
Chesnokovo is located on the left bank of the Amur River, 19 km southeast of Poyarkovo (the district's administrative centre) by road. Shadrino is the nearest rural locality.

References 

Rural localities in Mikhaylovsky District, Amur Oblast